Azucareros de Tezonapa is a Mexican football club that plays in Group 2 in the Tercera División de México. The club is based in Tezonapa, Veracruz, Mexico. The club takes its name from the city's history of sugar production.

See also
Football in Mexico

External links
Division.com

References 

Football clubs in Veracruz
2004 establishments in Mexico